Marty Houston (born January 7, 1968 in Hickory, North Carolina) is a former NASCAR driver. His younger brother, Andy and father Tommy Houston have driven in NASCAR as well.

Racing career

Craftsman Truck Series
Marty Houston made his debut seven races into the 1999 Craftsman Truck Series season, replacing Lonnie Rush in the famed No. 75 Spears Motorsports Chevy. His first race was at Pikes Peak, where Marty easily made it into the race with a 13th place starting effort, but his engine blew up and finished 29th midway into the race. Houston could only manage one top-10 in 1999, a 6th at Nazareth, although he did have ten top-20s in nineteen starts.

Despite the struggles in 1999, Houston was invited back for 2000, and Houston made the most of it. Houston came out of the gates leading two laps at the season opener at Daytona and was running in the top-10 when he got caught up in "The Big One." Yet, Houston finished tenth the next race, which proved to be one of ten times in 2000 he would finish in the top-10. The best was his eventual career best 4th at Kentucky, where he also earned his best career start of 3rd. (He also started 3rd at Phoenix) Perhaps most impressively was his average finish of 14.4. His worst position in 2000 was a pair of 25th-place runs, and finished 12th in points. Houston was noticed by Armando Fitz and got a new ride in the Busch Series for 2001, leaving the No. 75.

Houston did eventually make one more start in 2003, but that was clouded in controversy. Driving a fifth Ultra Motorsports Dodge in the season ending Ford 200, Houston started 18th and was running on the lead lap when he got loose in Turn 4 on Lap 100. He came down and slammed Brendan Gaughan, who was leading the points standings going into the race and who could've been overtaken by Houston's teammate Ted Musgrave for the championship. The wreck cost Gaughan the series championship and many Gaughan fans felt that Houston had intentionally wrecked Gaughan, though the team emphatically denied it. Gaughan himself was not happy about the wreck, specifically criticizing the fact that Houston was in the race and that Ultra Motorsports had fielded so many trucks in the race.

Busch Series
Houston, while driving for Spears Motorsports in 2000, agreed to drive the No. 82 Channellock Chevy in the late stages of the season for Felix Sabates. Houston made his series debut at Rockingham, qualifying in 36th and finished 28th. He had a 32nd at Phoenix, and a 14th-place finish at Homestead.

Sabates sold his team to Armando Fitz in early 2001. He started off with an eventual career-best finish of 13th at Daytona. From there, Houston's season went downhill. In 16 starts, the rookie Houston did not finish five times. In addition, Houston only had four top-20 finishes. Houston had been steadily improving though, as 2001 hit mid-season, but Fitz was not satisfied and Houston was released from the team in favor of Ron Hornaday.

Post-racing career
In 2002, Houston had been working on the No. 2 Ultra Motorsports Dodge for three years as tire changer. After the team closed in 2005, Houston went to work as a tire changer for Morgan-Dollar Motorsports on Kraig Kinser's crew.

Motorsports career results

NASCAR
(key) (Bold – Pole position awarded by qualifying time. Italics – Pole position earned by points standings or practice time. * – Most laps led.

Busch Series

Craftsman Truck Series

Winston West Series

References

External links

1968 births
Living people
NASCAR drivers
People from Hickory, North Carolina
Racing drivers from North Carolina